= Cartifact =

Map that is used primarily for design

A cartifact (portmanteau of cartograph and artifact) is a map that is used primarily for design rather than as a source of information. The term was invented by J.B. Post, former map librarian at the Free Library of Philadelphia. Geographic content such as a map of the UK on a mug, a bottle in the form of Africa or a commemorative plate is not the prime function of the object, if it has a specific function, which many artistic representations of maps do not, regardless of the place in which they were manufactured or made available for purchase by the public and without respect to historical accuracy or utility. A cartifact may be made of wood or ceramics or any other material whatsoever, including on paper or in stone or leather. The surface must be permanent, or at least must last for a long time, in order to be usable as a map, and need not even be portable. A cartifact may be humorous or may be highly abstruse. Context is very important to distinguish some cartifacts from artifacts or similar written records or artistic creations.

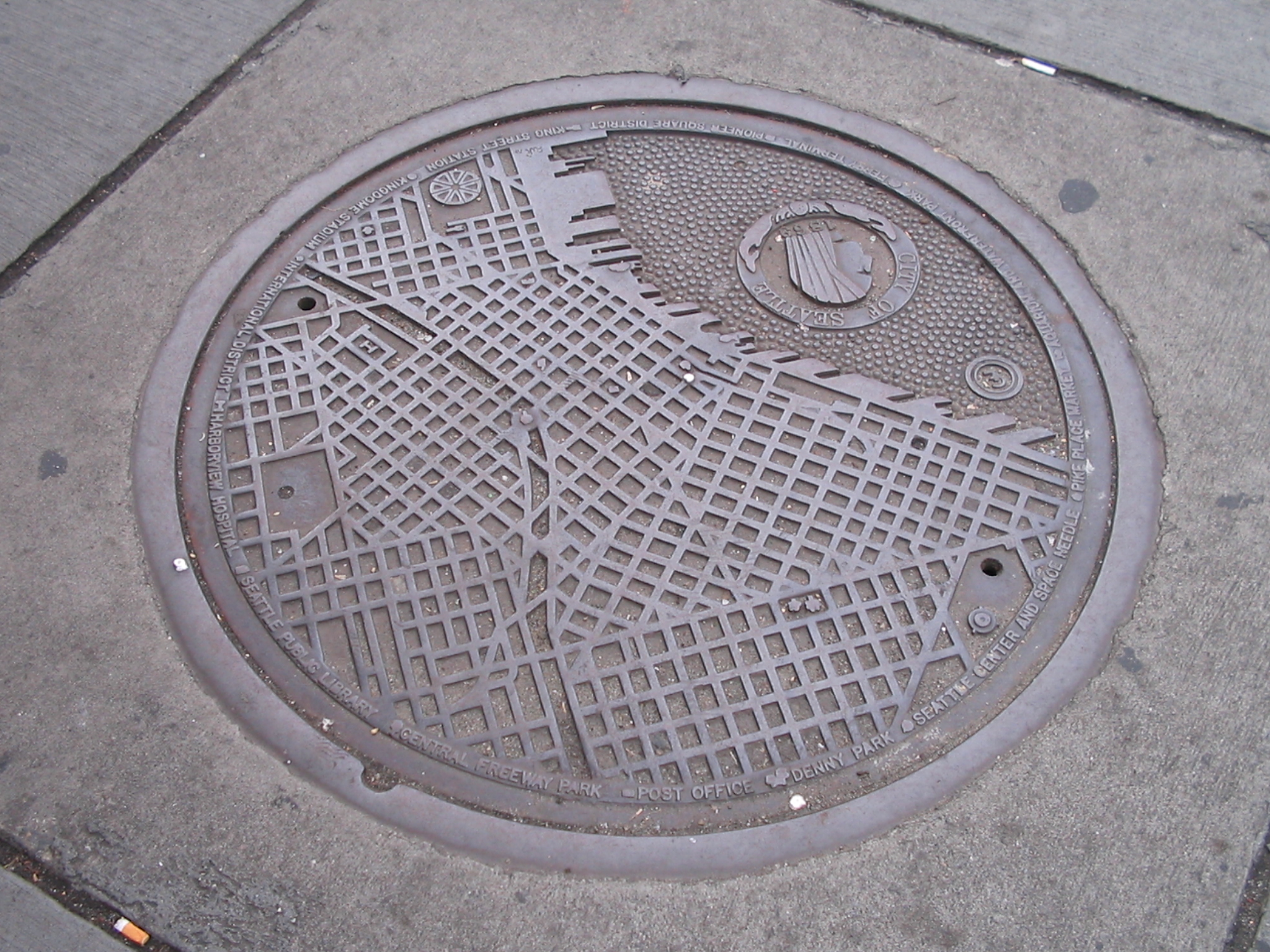
City of Seattle mapped on manhole cover. Photograph: Bruce Baugh, 2004.

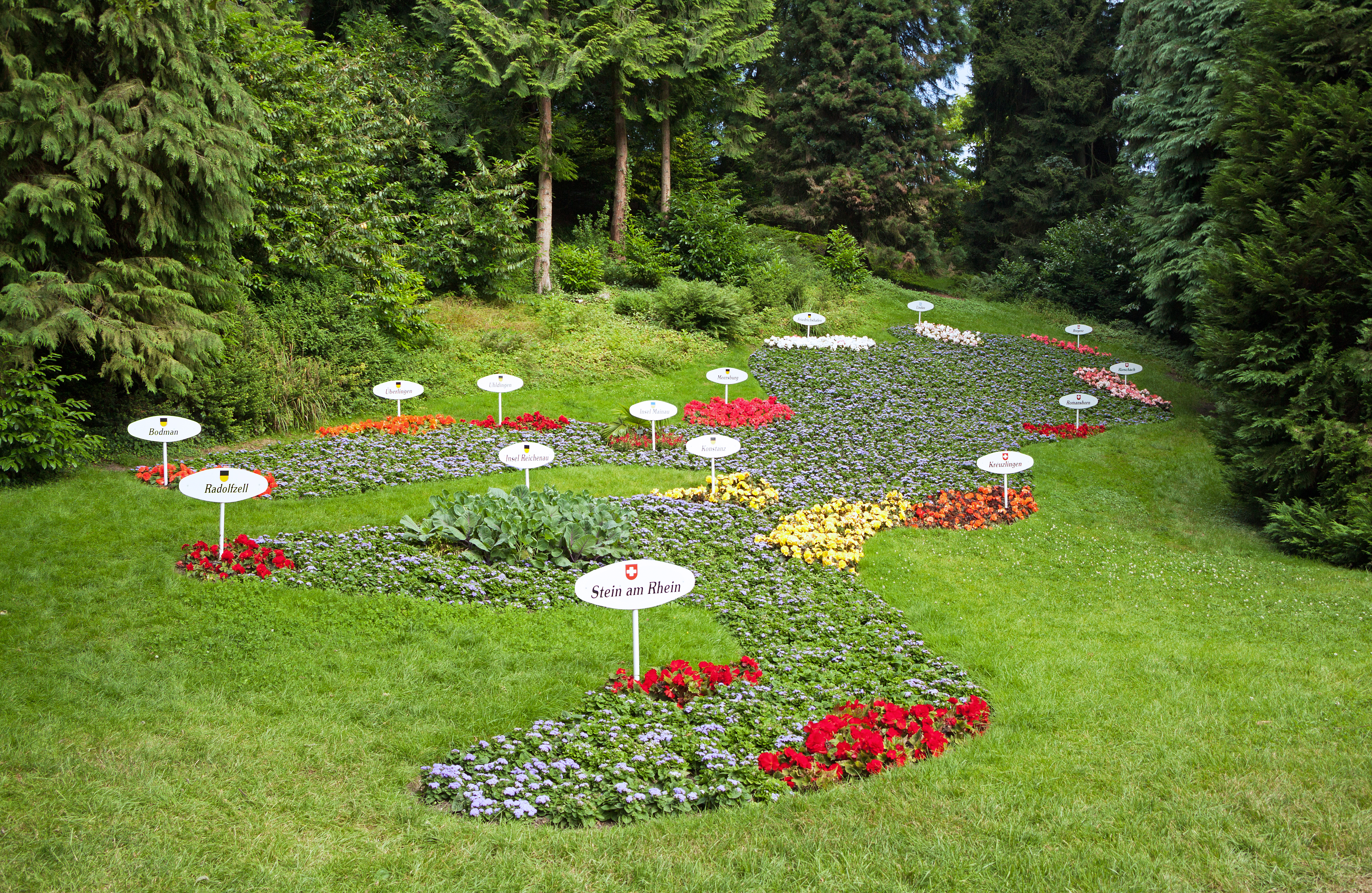
Map of the Lake Constance, Mainau, Lake Constance, Germany by H. Zell (2016).

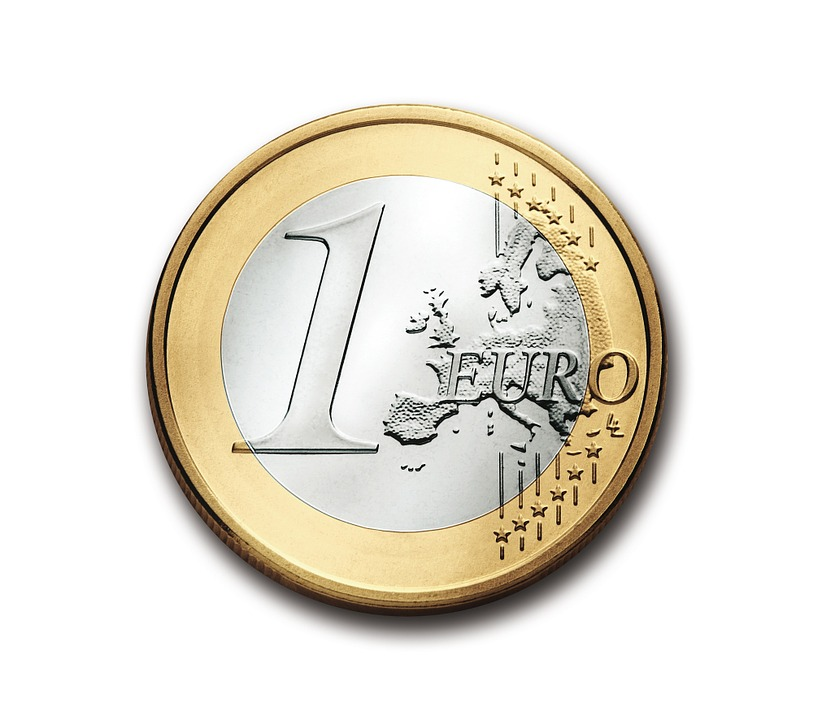
Common side of €1 coin.

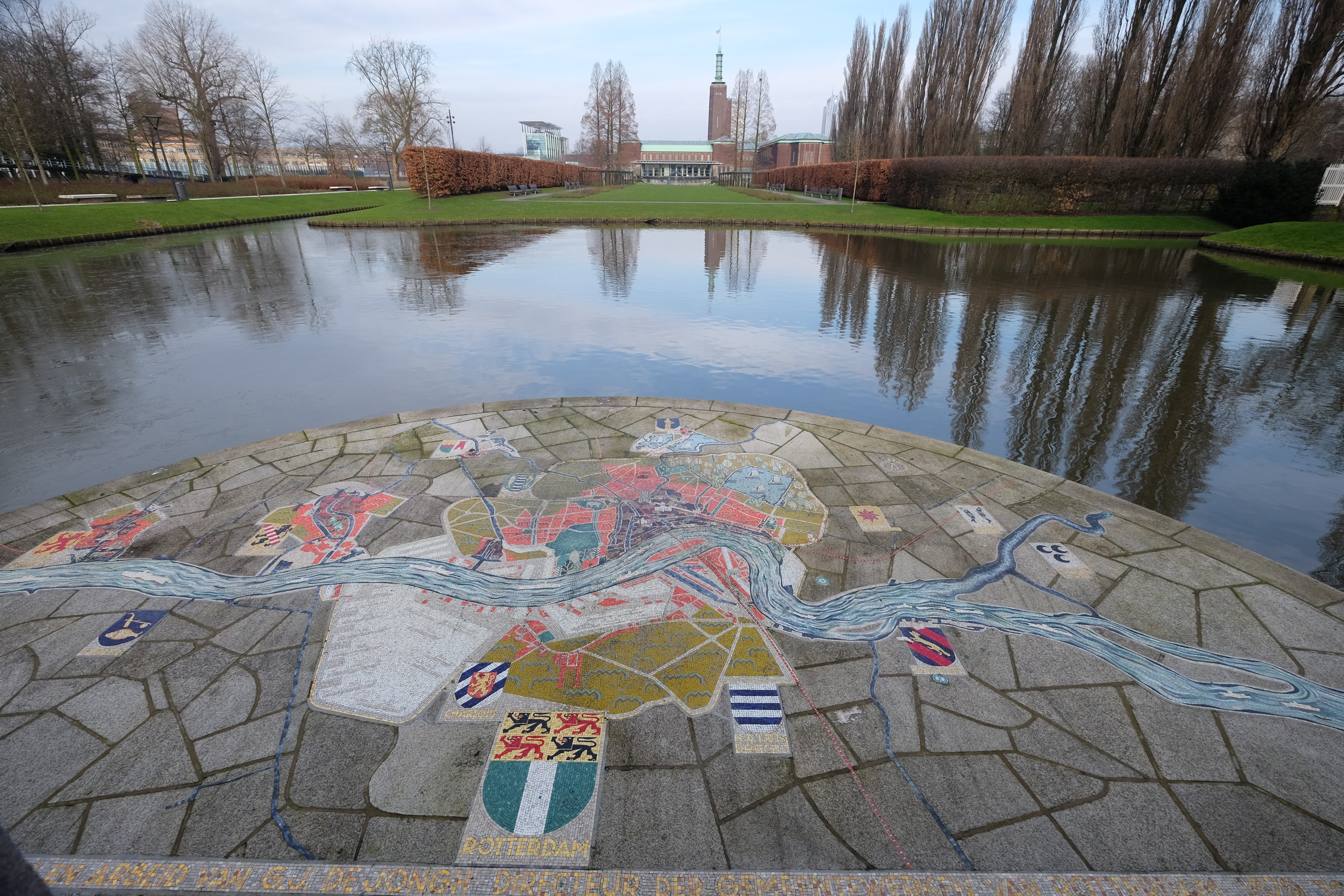
monument for G.J. de Jongh, 1935, in the garden of Museum Boijmans van Beuningen

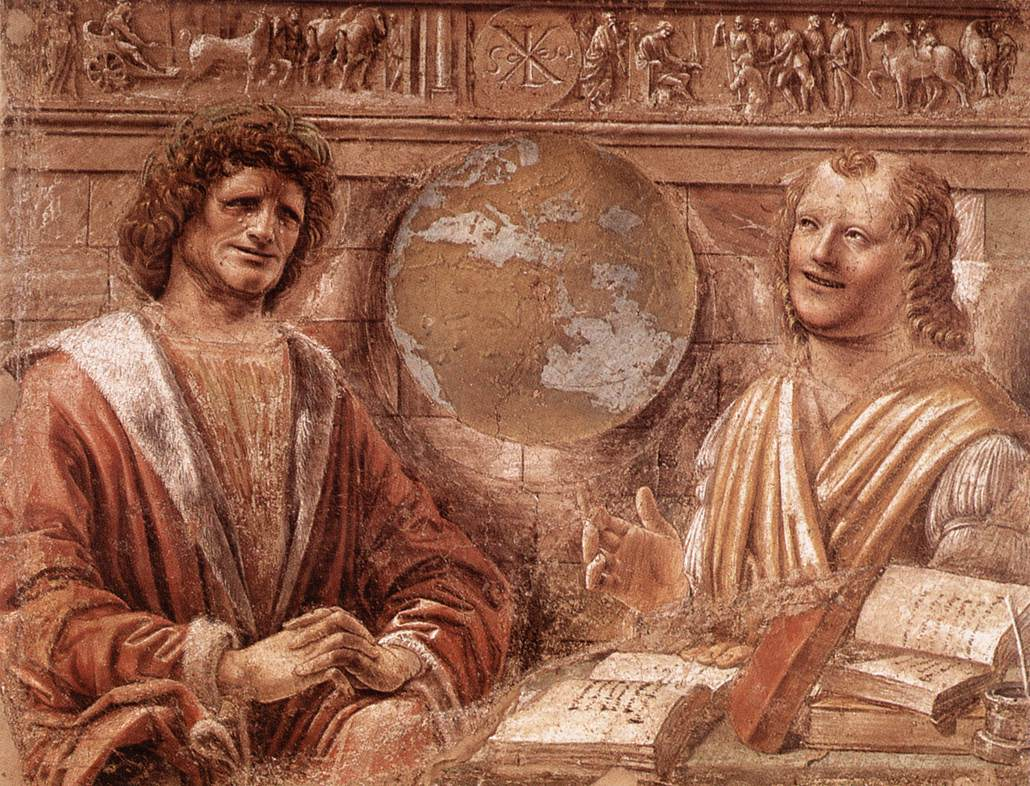
Crying Heraclitus and laughing Democritus (1477), from a fresco originally in the home of court poet and counselor Gaspare Visconti, now Casa Panigarola, Milan.

== Literature ==
- Rodney W. Shirley (1982). An early map of Japan on a porcelain plate^{[usurped]}.
- Tony Campbell (1999-). Miscellaneous. On: Map History / History of Cartography: THE Gateway to the Subject.
- Jan Smits (2009). Cartifacts, a completely different kind of map!. In: Journal of map & geography libraries, vol. 5 number 2, p. 177-186.
- Jan Smits (2015). A phenomenology of cartifacts.
- Caitlin Dempsey (2021). What is a cartifact? .
